"Be My Lover" is a song by rock band Alice Cooper. It originally appeared on the group's Killer album in 1971 and was released as a single in early 1972.  The song was written by guitarist Michael Bruce and was produced by Bob Ezrin.

The song's lyrics are semi-autobiographical, coming from the perspective of a musician trying to seduce a woman and telling her what he does for a living ("I told her that I came from Detroit city / and I played guitar in a long-haired rock and roll band"). The musician recalls that the woman "asked me why the singer’s name was Alice." The song reached No. 49 on the Billboard Hot 100 singles chart, remaining on the chart for ten weeks.

Releases on albums
 Killer – 1971
 Alice Cooper's Greatest Hits – 1974
 The Beast of Alice Cooper – 1989
 The Life and Crimes of Alice Cooper – 1999
 Mascara & Monsters: The Best of Alice Cooper – 2001
 The Essentials – Alice Cooper – 2002
 School's Out and Other Hits – 2004

Cover versions
The following artists have covered "Be My Lover":
 Mojo Nixon and Skid Roper (1986)
 Joan Jett & the Blackhearts (1993)
 Scream featuring Sim Cain (2010)

References

Alice Cooper songs
1972 singles
Song recordings produced by Bob Ezrin
Songs written by Michael Owen Bruce
1971 songs
Warner Records singles